Boyce may refer to:

Places

Australia
 Mount Boyce, Blue Mountains range, New South Wales

United States
 Boyce, Louisiana
 Boyce, Tennessee
 Boyce, Virginia
 Boyce Park, a  county park in Allegheny County, Pennsylvania. It is a part of the county's  network of nine distinct parks

People
 Boyce (surname)

Fictional
 Boyce (Green Wing), character from the British sitcom Green Wing
 Boycie (Terrence Aubrey Boyce), character from the British sitcoms Only Fools and Horses and The Green Green Grass played by John Challis